Mohamed Zine El-Abidine Sebbah (born 22 March 1987 in Oran) is an Algerian footballer who plays for ASM Oran.

Career
Sebbah started his career with hometown club MC Oran, making his first team debut in a 4–1 victory over CR Belouizdad on 6 August 2009 in the 2009–10 Algerian Championnat National. He finished the season with 28 league appearances for Oran. Sebbah made 17 league appearances for Oran in the 2010–11 season, the first season following the formation of the professional Algerian Ligue Professionnelle 1.

Honours
 Won the Algeria Cup for U-20 with MC Oran in 2005

References

External links
DZFOOT. Profile 
Eurosport.se Profile 
Le Buteur Profile 
 Zine El Abidine Sebbah, best player of MC Oran in June & July 2011 - mouloudia.com
Soccerpunter.com Profile

1987 births
Living people
Footballers from Oran
Algerian footballers
Association football defenders
Association football midfielders
Association football utility players
MC Oran players
CS Constantine players
ASM Oran players
Algerian Ligue Professionnelle 1 players
21st-century Algerian people